Cape Flattery is the northwesternmost point of the contiguous United States. It is in Clallam County, Washington on the Olympic Peninsula, where the Strait of Juan de Fuca joins the Pacific Ocean. It is also part of the Makah Reservation, and is the northern boundary of the Olympic Coast National Marine Sanctuary. Cape Flattery can be reached from a short hike, most of which is boardwalked. The westernmost point in the contiguous United States is at Cape Alava, south of Cape Flattery in Olympic National Park.

The Cape Flattery Lighthouse is on Tatoosh Island, just off the cape. Makah Bay and Neah Bay are on either side of the cape. Neah Bay, Washington is the closest town to the cape.

History

James Cook
Cape Flattery is the oldest permanently named feature in Washington state, being described and named by James Cook on March 22, 1778.  Cook wrote: "... there appeared to be a small opening which flattered us with the hopes of finding an harbour ... On this account I called the point of land to the north of it Cape Flattery."

Japanese castaways in 1834
In 1834, the first Japanese persons (including Otokichi) known to have set foot on what is now Washington state arrived in a dismasted, rudderless ship that ran aground near Cape Flattery.  The three survivors of the broken ship were held as slaves by the local Makah people. When William H. McNeill learned about them, he took them to British authorities at Fort Vancouver, under orders from John McLoughlin of the Hudson's Bay Company which controlled the site.

Fuca Pillar

Fuca Pillar is a tall, almost rectangular, rock on the west side of Cape Flattery. It is named after Juan de Fuca, a Greek sailor who explored for Spain. Fuca has a doubtful claim to being the first European explorer to see the Fuca Pillar and to explore the Strait of Juan de Fuca, also named for him.  The first generally accepted mention of the pillar was by John Meares in 1788.

In popular culture

Literature
The children's novel Ghost Canoe (1998) by Will Hobbs is set on Tatoosh Island and Neah Bay in 1874.
Parts of the young adult novel Freaky Green Eyes (2003) by Joyce Carol Oates are set here in present day. 
The novel When Wolf Comes (2009) by John Pappas is set in Cape Flattery in 1801. 
D.G. Driver's novel Echo of the Cliffs (2017), the third in the young adult trilogy of the Juniper Sawfeather series of novels, has parts that take place at Cape Flattery and Fuca Pillar.

Notes

External links

Landforms of Clallam County, Washington
Flattery